John Frederick Peel Rawlinson (21 December 1860 – 14 January 1926) was an English barrister, politician and footballer. An amateur, he won the FA Cup with Old Etonians in 1882 and made one appearance for England in 1882 playing as a goalkeeper, before serving as a Member of Parliament for Cambridge University from 1906 to 1926.

Career

Football
The youngest son of Sir Christopher Rawlinson, a former Chief Justice of Madras, John Rawlinson was born in New Alresford, Hampshire and educated at Twyford School, and Eton College, before going up to Trinity College, Cambridge where he won a Cambridge University football "Blue" in 1882 and 1883.

He continued to play for the Old Etonians whilst at university, helping them reach three successive FA Cup finals from 1881 to 1883, losing out 3–0 to Old Carthusians in 1881 and going down to a surprise 2–1 defeat to Blackburn Olympic in 1883. In the 1882 FA Cup Final, he was goalkeeper for the Old Etonians in the final against Blackburn Rovers. According to the match report in Gibbons' "Association Football in Victorian England", after the Old Etonians went 1–0 up by half-time, "Rovers had a couple of chances to level the scores, which were easily dealt with by Rawlinson in the Etonian goal" thus helping the Etonians to claim the cup for the second time in four seasons.

His solitary appearance for England came on 18 February 1882 against Ireland. As goalkeeper, he had little to do as the England forwards ran riot, scoring thirteen goals without reply.

In 1882 he became a member of the committee for the Corinthians and later served on the Football Association committee from 1885 to 1886.

He was also a member of the Wanderers club.

C.W. Alcock described Rawlinson as an "excellent goalkeeper, cool and sure", though he was said to be almost too casual at times.

Legal and political career
At university Rawlinson was a Prizeman in Common Law and achieved degrees of 1st Class Law Tripos in 1882, LL.B. in 1883, LL.M. in 1887, and honorary LL.D. from the same university in 1920.

He qualified as a barrister and was called to the bar at the Inner Temple in 1884, becoming a QC in 1897, practising on the South-East Circuit. He was a member of the General Council of the Bar from its inception in 1894 and later served as vice-chairman. He was appointed recorder of Cambridge in 1896, and in 1901 became a county Justice of the Peace for Cambridgeshire.

In 1895 he legally represented the Treasury at the government official inquiry into the Jameson Raid in South Africa.

He was elected Conservative Member of Parliament for Cambridge University in 1906 and continued as an MP until his death.

He was co-author with his father of "Rawlinson's Municipal Corporations' Acts" (1883), which became a standard work on the local government laws and went into ten editions.

He was appointed a Privy Counsellor in 1923.

Rawlinson was a school governor of Eton, Malvern and Brighton College, Fellow of Eton College, Honorary Fellow of Pembroke College, Cambridge, and from 1918 Deputy High Steward of Cambridge University.

Death

Rawlinson died, unmarried, at his chambers in 5 Crown Office Row, Temple, London, after ten days' illness with pleurisy at the age of 65, and was buried at Brookwood Cemetery, Woking, Surrey.

Honours

Football
Old Etonians
FA Cup winner: 1882
FA Cup finalist: 1881 & 1883

References

External links
 
 
 England profile

1860 births
1926 deaths
People from Alresford
English footballers
England international footballers
People educated at Eton College
Old Etonians F.C. players
Cambridge University A.F.C. players
Corinthian F.C. players
Conservative Party (UK) MPs for English constituencies
Members of the Parliament of the United Kingdom for the University of Cambridge
Burials at Brookwood Cemetery
UK MPs 1906–1910
UK MPs 1910
UK MPs 1910–1918
UK MPs 1918–1922
UK MPs 1922–1923
UK MPs 1923–1924
UK MPs 1924–1929
Alumni of Trinity College, Cambridge
Wanderers F.C. players
People educated at Twyford School
Members of the Privy Council of the United Kingdom
Association football goalkeepers
British sportsperson-politicians
FA Cup Final players
Fellows of Eton College
People from Walberton
English barristers